Albion Township is one of thirteen townships in Noble County, Indiana, United States. As of the 2010 census, its population was 2,456 and it contained 988 housing units.

Geography

Cities, towns, villages
 Albion, the county seat (vast majority)

Cemeteries
The township contains Rose Hill Cemetery.

Major highways
  Indiana State Road 8
  Indiana State Road 9

Lakes
 Little Lake

Climate

School districts
 Central Noble Community School Corporation

Political districts
 Indiana's 3rd congressional district
 State House District 52
 State Senate District 13

References
 
 United States Census Bureau 2008 TIGER/Line Shapefiles
 IndianaMap

External links
 Indiana Township Association
 United Township Association of Indiana
 City-Data.com page for Albion Township

Townships in Noble County, Indiana
Townships in Indiana